"Drunk Girls" is a song by American rock band LCD Soundsystem. It was released as the second single from their third studio album, This Is Happening (2010), on May 3, 2010. Band frontman James Murphy has described the song as "dumb" but added "I like dumb, short stuff." The 7" single features a cover of the song by San Francisco psychedelic rock band Wooden Shjips.

Music video
The music video for the single was co-directed by Spike Jonze and James Murphy.  The video features Murphy and bandmates Nancy Whang and Pat Mahoney attempting to sing while being abused by people dressed as pandas.  The video was shot at Factory Studios in Brooklyn, NY.

Track listing

7" single
A. Drunk Girls
B. Drunk Girls (Wooden Shjips version)

12" single
A. Drunk Girls
B. Drunk Girls (Holy Ghost! remix)

Charts

References

LCD Soundsystem songs
American new wave songs
2010 singles
Music videos directed by Spike Jonze
Songs written by James Murphy (electronic musician)
Songs written by Gavin Russom
2010 songs